Super Taranta! is the fourth album by Gypsy punk band Gogol Bordello. It was released on July 10, 2007 by SideOneDummy Records, produced by the band and Victor Van Vugt. The album charted in several countries, including reaching #67 in the UK and #115 on the US Billboard 200. "Wonderlust King" was released as the album's only single, in August 2007.

Reception 
The album was ranked #14 on Rolling Stones list of the Top 50 Albums of 2007, and the track "Ultimate" was #82 on the magazine's list of the 100 Best Songs of 2007. 

Super Taranta! has a score of 80/100 on the review aggregator Metacritic, indicating "generally favorable reviews". Music critic Robert Christgau gave the album an A+ rating, calling Gogol Bordello "the world's most visionary band".

Track listing

Production 
Produced by Victor Van Vugt and Gogol Bordello
Recorded by Victor Van Vugt at Long View Farm Studios, March '07
Additional recordings done at Grace Studios, NY and Integrated Studios, NY, March/April '07
Assistant Engineers: Josh Sadlier-Brown, Integrated Studios and Ian Neil, Long View Farm Recording Studios
Mixed by Victor Van Vugt and Eugene Hütz at Grace Studios, NY
Mastered by Emily Lazar at The Lodge
Design by: Cindy Heller
Photos by: Bela Borsodi, Keetja Allard, Danny North, Liubov Kulkova, Herman Dahlgren, Thomas Gobena, and Eric James Crawford

Personnel 
The Band
Eugene Hütz – vocals, acoustic guitar, percussion, fire buckets
Eliot Ferguson – drums, backing vocals
Thomas "Tommy T" Gobena – bass, backing vocals
Oren Kaplan – guitar, backing vocals
Sergey Ryabtsev – violin, backing vocals
Yuri Lemeshev – accordion, backing vocals
Pasha – accordion, backing vocals
Pamela Jintana Racine – percussion, backing vocals
Elizabeth Sun – percussion, backing vocals
Guests
Pedro Erazo – additional vocals on "Forces of Victory"
Piroshka Rac – additional vocals on "Suddenly... (I Miss Carpaty)"
Slavic Soul Party – brass on "Zina-Marina" and "American Wedding"
Ben Holmes – truba
John Carlson – truba
Jacob Garchik – baritone truba
Curtis Hasselbring – trombone
Matt Moran – bubanj

Charts

Trivia

"American Wedding" is heard at the end of the Fargo (TV series) episode, "The Principle of Restricted Choice".

References

2007 albums
Gogol Bordello albums
SideOneDummy Records albums
Albums produced by Victor Van Vugt
Albums recorded at Long View Farm